The Ambrose–Torquay Border Crossing connects the towns of Ambrose, North Dakota and Torquay, Saskatchewan on the Canada–US border. North Dakota Highway 42 on the American side joins Saskatchewan Highway 350 on the Canadian side.

Canadian side
The initial customs office was opened at Dupuis in June 1909, but was relocated closer to the border at Marienthal a month later. The two communities were in close proximity. A North-West Mounted Police (NWMP) corporal was in charge during the first year and the Port of North Portal provided administrative oversight. In 1912, the office moved into a government building. In 1935, a combined residence/office was erected, which was replaced in 1958. The crossing was renamed Torquay around the 1960s.

US side

In 1906, the railroad reached northward to Ambrose. Harvested grain flowed southward across the border in bond before re-entering Canada. This practice continued until the Canadian Pacific Railway opened the east–west Neptune branch through Torquay in 1913.

The United States continues to use the border station built in 1937, which was listed on the U.S. National Register of Historic Places in 2014. Ambrose is now largely a ghost town.

See also
 List of Canada–United States border crossings

References

Canada–United States border crossings
Geography of Saskatchewan
National Register of Historic Places in Divide County, North Dakota
Government buildings on the National Register of Historic Places in North Dakota
1909 establishments in North Dakota
1909 establishments in Saskatchewan
Cambria No. 6, Saskatchewan
Division No. 2, Saskatchewan